Planetary Annihilation is a real-time strategy PC game originally developed by Uber Entertainment, whose staff included several video game industry veterans who worked on Total Annihilation and Supreme Commander. The game was released in 2014, and the stand-alone expansion Planetary Annihilation: Titans was released in 2015.

Since 2018, Planetary Annihilation Inc. maintains development of both Planetary Annihilation and Planetary Annihilation: Titans via ongoing content additions and balance changes.

Gameplay
In interviews with PC Gamer and Joystiq, lead game developer Jon Mavor commented that the game's complexity and playtime can vary, from half-hour, 2-player battles to lengthy matches with potentially 40-players. However, at release 40-player matches were not yet available. Planetary Annihilation features a planet-based map system with different types of planets and asteroid like moons. Players will be able to conquer other planets and even entire systems on maps said to include "hundreds of worlds", through the Galactic War. These planets are dynamic in that they can be 'annihilated' using other planets or catalysts, a major focus for Uber Entertainment. The game's creators stated that Planetary Annihilation will resemble something of the 1997 real-time strategy Total Annihilation as its focus is more towards 'macro' gameplay as opposed to 'micro' gameplay. In development updates, Mavor has commented that "a million" in-game units is a design goal of the development team. The player(s) lose when their last commander is destroyed.

Development
Jon Mavor wrote the graphics engine for Total Annihilation, and was also the lead programmer on Supreme Commander. The game's art style was created by Steve Thompson, who also previously worked on Total Annihilation and Supreme Commander. Voice actor John Patrick Lowrie, who did all the narrations for Total Annihilation, did the narrations for Planetary Annihilation as well.

According to Mavor, while game visualization began in May 2012, three months prior to the game's public announcement, the game concept itself had been in development for approximately three years by that time. Additionally, the server and game engine technologies that would underpin the game had been in development for several years prior to the game's public reveal, with some of the server technology having already made its way into PlayFab, Uber Entertainment's back-end server network.

Kickstarter funding
Rather than pursue investor funding, Planetary Annihilations developer Uber Entertainment chose to use the crowdfunding site Kickstarter for their financial backing. They revealed the game to the public on August 15, 2012, with their Kickstarter funding goal set at $900,000.  At the campaign's conclusion on September 14, Planetary Annihilation had raised approximately $2,228,000 via Kickstarter and an additional $101,000 via PayPal.

Kickstarter featured Planetary Annihilation as the 11th Kickstarter project to have raised over a million dollars, using it to highlight the successes that games had been enjoying on the site.

Acquisition
In August 2018, a new company Planetary Annihilation Inc., formed from original PA developers and Kickstarter backers, acquired the rights to Planetary Annihilation and Planetary Annihilation: Titans.  As of February 2021, the game still receives support in the form of balance changes, and several new units have been added. In addition, PA Inc. continues to support tournaments and seasonal events.

Release
The Alpha was launched on June 8, 2013 for alpha-level backers, with Steam Early Access since the 13th of June, 2013.

The Beta version of the game was released on September 26, 2013, and it was later opened up to all initial Kickstarter backers on November 19. On December 6, the final release date was postponed to early 2014.

Planetary Annihilation launched on September 5, 2014 on Windows, Mac and Linux.

Planetary Annihilation: Titans, a standalone expansion of the game was released on August 18, 2015. It adds 21 units to the game, including five titan class units. It also adds multi-level terrain, a bounty mode, and an improved tutorial.

Planetary Annihilation: Titans was gifted free to original Kickstarter backers from 2012 with a discount for other owners.  Classic Planetary Annihilation was removed from sale on September 5, 2018.

Critical reception 

Planetary Annihilation received a mixed reception upon release. The game was praised for its ambitious concept, but criticized for playability and overall incompleteness. Rock, Paper, Shotgun's Brendan Caldwell writes: "Planetary Annihilation is a slick, modernised RTS, engineered from the ground up to appeal to the fast-paced, competitive, hotkey-loving esports crowd". PC Gamer's Emanuel Maiberg, experiencing hard to learn gameplay unaided by proper tutorials and disrupted by technical issues, states: "I know there's a great, massive RTS beneath all these issues. I've seen glimpses of it when everything works correctly, but at the moment I can't recommend Planetary Annihilation without a warning that it's bound to disappoint and frustrate, even if you do teach yourself to play it". IGN's Rob Zacny summarizes: "A cool idea about robot armies battling across an entire solar system breaks apart when the realities of controlling multiple worlds at the same time set in".

References

External links

Interview with director John Mavor

2014 video games
Crowdfunded video games
Early access video games
Kickstarter-funded video games
Linux games
MacOS games
Real-time strategy video games
Uber Entertainment games
Video games developed in the United States
Windows games
Video games using procedural generation